Riano is a  (municipality) in the Metropolitan City of Rome in the Italian region of Latium.

Riano borders the following municipalities: Castelnuovo di Porto, Monterotondo, Rome, Sacrofano.

References

Cities and towns in Lazio